Nell Bryden (born March 8, 1977) is an American singer-songwriter.

Early life
Bryden was born in New York Hospital and grew up in an artist loft on Atlantic Avenue in Brooklyn Heights. Her parents divorced when she was five, and she lived primarily with her father, Lewis Bryden, a painter and sculptor, until she was 12 years old. Bryden then moved in with her mother, Jane, a classical soprano and professor at Smith College in Western Massachusetts. Bryden graduated from Amherst Regional High School, and deferred going to college for a year to skydive on a drop zone in Arizona, study Italian and opera in Manhattan and eventually travel to Australia for three months of backpacking, where she bought her first guitar. A classically trained musician (she studied the cello for ten years), Bryden dreamed of becoming an opera singer before hearing Jimi Hendrix and Janis Joplin for the first time. Bryden attended Wellesley College, where she graduated with honors. It was during this time that she began performing her songs live in the Boston folk and rock clubs.

Musical career
Bryden was living in Greenwich Village in New York during 9/11, an event that had a "profound" effect on her. The following year, she recorded an album called Day For Night in Nashville with producer Fred Mollin, and toured the US to support the album. Disillusioned with the music business, she travelled to New Orleans to write a new album, inspired by the jazz, roots and blues influences of the Crescent City. Bryden began recording with producer John Hill, but after the project ran out of money they returned to New York with a half-finished album. Two weeks later, Hurricane Katrina hit New Orleans, displacing many of the musicians on the record and destroying much of the town.

Bryden began touring the UK and Ireland by self-booking her tours, playing up to 250 shows a year abroad, opening for artists such as the Counting Crows and KT Tunstall. After coming across a Milton Avery painting during an attic clear out (a gift from her father), Bryden auctioned the piece and received a substantial amount for it. She then used the money to re-record her album, but this time around bringing on board Grammy-winning record producer David Kershenbaum.

The resulting album, What Does it Take, came out on 12 October 2009 on Cooking Vinyl in the UK and Ireland.

In 2008, following a chance meeting with a US Army colonel at SXSW in Austin, Texas, Bryden flew to Iraq to play for the Armed Forces.  Her second tour there in 2009 was documented by Susan Cohn Rockefeller for her film Striking A Chord.

Shake The Tree was recorded at Metrophonic Studios, outside London, in the summer of 2010. Bryden collaborated with British guitarist and songwriter Patrick Mascall, with whom she began writing songs that reflected their mutual admiration for the likes of Bruce Springsteen, Dolly Parton, Willie Nelson and Emmylou Harris.  By the following autumn, they had amassed forty songs.

Bryden started recording a new album in 2011 at State of the Ark studio in London, owned by Terry Britten. The first single from Shake The Tree, "Buildings and Treetops", came out in June 2012 and the album was released on the 18th. The single was awarded A-list BBC Radio 2  rotation and was greatly supported by Smooth FM and UK regional radio. Following the success of the first single "Buildings & Treetops" (which was a top 20 airplay hit), "Sirens" was released on 10 September 2012, and spent three weeks on the BBC Radio 2 A-list. A poignant and soaring anthem inspired by Bryden's hometown of New York City, as well as her personal experience during the devastating aftermath of 9/11, "Sirens" was a song Bryden avoided writing for ten years. One day in August 2011, as the ten year anniversary of 9/11 approached, she began describing her experience to Mascall at Metrophonic Studios.  By that afternoon, they had completed the song.

Following the release of "Sirens", Bryden was approached by Take That lead singer Gary Barlow, who asked her to join him as the support act for his UK tour from November to January 2013. During these few months, Bryden also supported Jools Holland for several of his UK dates, including a second performance at the Royal Albert Hall,  the first with Gary Barlow earlier that month. Her 40 date string of gigs ended with a Nell Bryden headline tour in January 2013. Bryden released two further singles, "Shake The Tree" in January and "Echoes" in May 2013 with a further headlining tour from May to June of that year. The summer months saw her perform at a host of music festivals including V Festival. In September 2013, singer Cher  recorded "Sirens" and released it as part of her album "Closer To The Truth".

Bryden released her record Wayfarer, a double CD that included both the original and acoustic versions of the album, on 28 July 2014 through Absolute. The debut single from this album, "All You Had" was released at the end of 2013 and added to the BBC Radio 2 A-list. The second single and title track from the album, "Wayfarer" was added to A-list rotation at BBC Radio 2 and released on 4 August 2014. The Christmas-themed song “May You Never Be Alone,” was covered by Susan Boyle and released on her album A Wonderful World. Bryden's version of the song was added to the BBC Radio 2 playlist in 2014. In 2015 Bryden released a duet with Tom McRae, “Waves feat Tom McRae,” which went on the BBC Radio 2 playlist. The single “Wolves” made the BBC Radio 2 playlist in 2015.

In 2016 Bryden worked with producer Andy Wright to record Bloom, her fifth studio album. “What Is It You Want” was the lead single, and was added to the BBC Radio 2 playlist, along with subsequent singles, “Thought I Was Meant For You,” and “Dared The World And Won.” For the song “Thought I Was Meant For You,” director Rhys Davies created a cinematic video that told the story of a gay older couple, one of whom suffered from Alzheimer's.

Nell released an EP with four songs from the collection in March 2019. The EP was entitled Soundtrack To Little Wing. Part 1. She launched the new material live on BBC Radio 2 when she took part in the Comic Relief Special with Tess Daly and Claudia Winkleman. The radio remix of Smoke In My Heart was added to the BBC Radio 2 playlist.

In May 2019, Nell released a compilation of songs filmed in her London home. The album, called Living Room Sessions, was released in conjunction with Nell's performance on Ken Bruce Piano Room on BBC Radio 2.

In 2019, Nell became a British citizen; she has dual nationality with America. Nell moved from London to New York City in August 2019. In March 2020, Nell’s song Amy became her 20th playlisted song on BBC Radio 2. Nell was the first artist to collaborate remotely with the BBC Concert Orchestra for a House Music Session on Ken Bruce’s Radio 2 show; the show broadcast during lockdown in March 2020. In August 2020, BBC Radio 2 added Nell’s single These Changes to the playlist.

Radio presenting
Nell presented her first radio show on BBC Radio 2 on the 25th August 2014. The show was an hour-long dedication to music born out of New York and featured some of the artists who had inspired Bryden as songwriter, as she grew up in the city.

In January 2016 she curated and presented a four part mini-series, called Nell’s Angels, Series 1, on BBC Radio 2. The show featured her favourite female artists, broken into categories. The Gospel and Soul episodes aired on January 4th 2016, Folk aired on January 11th 2016, Country and Blues aired on January 18th 2016 and Jazz aired on January 25th 2016.

Following on the success of Nell’s Angels, Series 1, she presented Nell’s Angels, Series 2 for BBC Radio 2 in August 2016. The categories for the second series were R&B, aired August 1st 2016, Rock, which aired on 8th August 2016, Roots and Americana, aired August 15th 2016 and Urban Pop, which aired on 22nd August 2016.

In 2017 Nell presented a 4-part mini-series on BBC Radio 2, called Nell’s Kitchen, an historical exploration of New York’s music scenes. The mini-series was recorded in Manhattan and aired between 16th January and 6th February 2017.

Discography

Studio albums

Singles

Live albums

References

External links
 

Musicians from Brooklyn
Wellesley College alumni
Living people
1977 births
Singer-songwriters from New York (state)
21st-century American singers
Amherst Regional High School (Massachusetts) alumni